Berberis gagnepainii, or Gagnepain's barberry, is a species of flowering plant in the family Berberidaceae, first described in 1908. It is endemic to China, known from Guizhou, Hubei, Sichuan, and Yunnan Provinces.

Berberis gagnepainii is a shrub up to 2 m tall. The leaves are evergreen, simple, lanceolate to elliptical, toothed, the teeth tipped with short spines. The leaves and flowers are borne on short shoots in the axils of 3-parted spines. The inflorescence is a fascicle of 2-15 yellow flowers. The berries are glaucous (waxy), dark blue-black and oblong. Its habitats include montane thickets as well as forest margins and understories.

Its name is dedicated to François Gagnepain.

Gallery

References

gagnepainii
Flora of China
Plants described in 1908